Frank McCormack may refer to:

Frank McCormack (cyclist) (born 1969), American cyclist
Frank McCormack (footballer) (1924–2011), English footballer

See also
Frank MacCormack (born 1954), American baseball pitcher
Frank McCormick (1911–1982), American baseball first baseman
Frank McCormick (American football) (1894–1976), first South Dakotan to play professional football